Spread Out Historic District, also known as North Waynesville Addition, is a national historic district located at Waynesville, Haywood County, North Carolina.  It includes 67 contributing buildings in a predominantly residential section of Waynesville developed between about 1895 and 1958.   It includes notable examples of Queen Anne, Colonial Revival, and Bungalow / American Craftsman style architecture. Notable buildings include Waynesville Presbyterian Church (c. 1907) and two late-1920s apartment buildings.

It was listed on the National Register of Historic Places in 2010.

References

Houses on the National Register of Historic Places in North Carolina
Historic districts on the National Register of Historic Places in North Carolina
Buildings designated early commercial in the National Register of Historic Places
Queen Anne architecture in North Carolina
Colonial Revival architecture in North Carolina
Geography of Haywood County, North Carolina
National Register of Historic Places in Haywood County, North Carolina
Houses in Haywood County, North Carolina
Waynesville, North Carolina